Vladimir Mikhaylovich Yulygin (18 January 1936 – 26 April 2016) was a Russian professional football coach and player.

External links
 

1936 births
2016 deaths
Association football midfielders
FC Asmaral Moscow managers
FC Chornomorets Odesa players
FC Dynamo Stavropol managers
FC Khimik-Arsenal players
FK Köpetdag Aşgabat managers
FC Shinnik Yaroslavl players
FC Volgar Astrakhan managers
Russian football managers
Russian Premier League managers
SC Tavriya Simferopol managers
SC Tavriya Simferopol players
Soviet football managers
Soviet footballers
FC Torpedo NN Nizhny Novgorod players